The Douglas, Augusta & Gulf Railway was created as a subsidiary of the Georgia & Florida Railway (G&F) to consolidate lines of several smaller railroads.

It started in 1905 by acquiring the Barrows Bluff to Douglas, Georgia line that was from the Wadley & Mt. Vernon Railroad. The next year it bought the Pinebloom to Nashville, Georgia section of the Ocilla, Pinebloom & Valdosta Railway. Shortly afterward it took control of the Broxton-Hazlehurst branch of the Ocilla & Valdosta Railroad. From there, the DA&G built a new line from Douglas to Garrant, Georgia giving the railroad a line from Hazelhurst to Nashville.

The DA&G was absorbed by the G&F in 1907.

Defunct Georgia (U.S. state) railroads
Predecessors of the Southern Railway (U.S.)
Railway companies established in 1905
Railway companies disestablished in 1907
American companies established in 1905
American companies disestablished in 1907